Michal Beran (born February 22, 1973) is a Slovak former professional ice hockey player.

Beran spent the majority of his career with his hometown team MHC Martin of the Slovak Extraliga. He also played for HK Nitra, HC Dukla Trenčín, HKm Zvolen and MsHK Žilina as well as spells in Italy for Ritten Sport and in France with Ours de Villard-de-Lans of the Ligue Magnus.

References

1973 births
Living people
HK Dukla Trenčín players
HK Nitra players
HKM Zvolen players
MHC Martin players
MsHK Žilina players
Ours de Villard-de-Lans players
Sportspeople from Martin, Slovakia
Ritten Sport players
Slovak ice hockey forwards
Slovak expatriate ice hockey people
Expatriate ice hockey players in France
Expatriate ice hockey players in Italy
Slovak expatriate sportspeople in France
Slovak expatriate sportspeople in Italy